Puka Punta (Quechua puka red, punta peak; ridge, "red peak (or ridge)", also spelled Pucapunta) is a  mountain in the Chunta mountain range in the Andes of Peru. It is situated in the Huancavelica Region, Castrovirreyna Province, Santa Ana District, and in the Huancavelica Province, Huacocolpa District. Puka Punta lies northwest of K'allapayuq.

References

Mountains of Huancavelica Region
Mountains of Peru